The Hotel Königshof is a luxury hotel in Munich. It is part of the hotel group Geisel Privathotels and The Leading Hotels of the World. The building is listed as a historic monument in the Bavarian heritage register. Martin Fauster, the chef of the hotel restaurant since 2004, has received one Michelin Star.

Location 

The hotel is located in the Munich city district named Ludwigsvorstadt, just few meters west of the historic square named Karlsplatz (Stachus). Originally, a roundabout similar to the east side of the square was planned, yet it was never realized. The Hotel Königshof is situated in the apex of the proposed half-circle across from the Karlstor.

History 
In the beginning of the 19th century, the architect Gustav Vorherr received the land on which the hotel is located from King Max I. Joseph for his service regarding the expansion of the city. The architect eventually built a private residence in the classical style. The house, owned by Baron von Sternbach, served as a meeting place for a group of scholars who were called to Munich by Maximilian I. Joseph (Bavaria). The guests included writers such as Paul Heyse, Emanuel Geibel, Friedrich Bodenstedt, as well as the art historian and poet Adolf Friedrich von Schack, court theatre director Francis von Dingelstedt, and Franz von Kobell. In 1866, the building with the central location between the city center and the main train station became Hotel Bellevue. After the beginning of World War I, the hotel was renamed Hotel Königshof. In 1938, the hotel, which consisted of 200 beds at the time, was taken over by Karl and Anna Geisel. Both started as innkeepers at the Oktoberfest Löwenbräu beer tent, and also owned several wine farms. During World War II, the hotel was destroyed up to the outer walls. After the destruction, the Geisel family decided to rebuild the hotel, which was completed in 1955. In 1970, a complete renovation was undertaken. At the beginning of 2019, the hotel is being demolished, and an elegant replacement will be built in its place.

Facilities 
The hotel offers 71 single and double rooms, 16 suites, 180 underground parking spaces, as well as a spa area with sauna, steam bath, whirlpool, and fitness room. Moreover, the gourmet restaurant Königshof, which was awarded one Michelin star and 18 out of 20 points from Gault-Millau, is located inside the hotel.

Awards 
Among others, the Hotel Königshof received the following awards:
 Hotelier of the Year 2008 - AHGZ
 Hotel of the Year 2005 - Schlummer Atlas
 Guide Michelin – One star for Martin Fauster, Gourmet Restaurant Königshof
 Gault-Millau - 18 of 20 points for Martin Fauster, Gourmet Restaurant Königshof
 Gault-Millau - Sommelier of the Year 2008, Stéphane Thuriot
 Concierge of the Year - 2011 Christian Netzle

Literature

External links 
 Website Hotel Königshof

Hotels in Munich